Pyhäjärvi is a common name of lakes in Finland. It may refer to
Pyhäjärvi (Tampere region), in the Pirkanmaa Region
Pyhäjärvi (Pyhäjärvi), in Pyhäjärvi municipality
Pyhäjärvi (Satakunta), in Satakunta
Pyhäjärvi (Karelia), in Karelia on the Finland–Russia border
Pyhäjärvi (Kymenlaakso), in the northern Kymenlaakso
Pyhäjärvi (Saarijärvi), in the Central Finland

Pyhäjärvi has also been the name of several municipalities of Finland:
Pyhäjärvi, in Northern Bothnia
Pyhäjärvi Ul, former municipality in Uusimaa, now part of Karkkila
Otradnoye, Priozersky District, Leningrad Oblast, formerly the Finnish municipality of Pyhäjärvi Vpl., now in Leningrad Oblast, Russia
Svyatozero, a lake and former municipality in the Republic of Karelia, was occupied by Finland 1941–44